Danial Williams (born June 13, 1993), is a Thai-born Australian Muay Thai kickboxer and mixed martial artist currently signed to ONE Championship, where he competes in the Strawweight division. As of July 29, 2022, he is ranked #5 in the ONE Championship Strawweight rankings and he is ranked #5 in the ONE Championship Strawweight Muay Thai rankings.

Background
Williams was born on June 13, 1993 in Phan district, Chiang Rai province, Thailand. His father is Australian and mother Thai, when he was 8 months old, they came to Australia to live here for a better life.

Williams was a shy child whose mixed heritage always made him feel like a bit of an outcast. He wasn't like his school friends in Australia, or like his family in Thailand, and he struggled to find his place.

Muay Thai & Kickboxing career

Early career
Williams faced Aaron Leigh for the CMT Super Bantamweight Championship at Caged Muay Thai 3 on July 6, 2013. He won the fight by a fourth-round knockout.

Williams faced Shota Takiya in the 2015 K-1 World GP 2015 Super Bantamweight Tournament quarterfinals, held on April 19, 2015. He lost the fight by majority decision.

ONE Championship
Williams made his ONE Super Series debut against ONE Flyweight Champion Rodtang Jitmuangnon in a non-title fight at ONE on TNT 1 on April 7, 2021. Williams lost the back-and-forth bout by unanimous decision. The fight was later named ONE Super Series Fight of the Year by ONE Championship.

Williams is scheduled to face Rui Botelho on March 25, 2023, at ONE Fight Night 8.

Mixed martial arts career

ONE Championship
Williams faced the former ONE Strawweight World champion Dejdamrong Sor Amnuaysirichoke at ONE: Bad Blood on February 12, 2022. He won the fight by a second-round knockout.

Williams faced Namiki Kawahara at ONE 156 on April 22, 2022. He won the fight by unanimous decision.

Williams faced Zelang Zhaxi at ONE 159 on July 22, 2022. He won the fight by a first-round knockout. This win earned her the Performance of the Night award.

Williams faced Jeremy Miado on October 22, 2022 at ONE on Prime Video 3. At weigh-ins, Jeremy Miado came in at 127 lbs, 2 pounds over the limit. The bout continued at a catchweight and Miado paid a fine to Williams. Williams lost by third-round technical knockout.

Titles and accomplishments
 ONE Championship
ONE Super Series Fight of the Year 2021 
Performance of the Night (One time) 
 Caged Muay Thai
 CMT Super Bantamweight Championship (Two times)
World Muaythai Council
 2015 WMC Featherweight World Champion
World Kickboxing Federation
 2013 WKBF World Flyweight Champion
International Federation of Muaythai Associations
 2015 Muaythai University World Cup -60kg

Mixed martial arts record

|-
|Loss
|align=center|6–2
|Jeremy Miado
|TKO (punches)
|ONE on Prime Video 3
|
|align=center| 3
|align=center| 0:31
|Kuala Lumpur, Malaysia
|
|-
| Win
| align=center| 6–1
| Zelang Zhaxi 
| KO (punch)
| ONE 159
| 
| align=center| 1
| align=center| 4:20
| Kallang, Singapore
| 
|-
| Win
| align=center| 5–1
| Namiki Kawahara
| Decision (unanimous)
| ONE 156
| 
| align=center| 3
| align=center| 5:00
| Kallang, Singapore
| 
|-
| Win
| align=center| 4–1
| Dejdamrong Sor Amnuaysirichoke
| KO (punch to the body)
| 
| 
| align=center| 2
| align=center| 1:35
| Kallang, Singapore
|  
|-
| Win
| align=center| 3–1
| Jake Hearl
| TKO (punches)
| Eternal MMA 51
| 
| align=center| 2
| align=center| 3:34
| Perth, Australia
| 
|-
| Win
| align=center| 2–1
| Chris Wase
| TKO (punches)
| Eternal MMA 48
| 
| align=center| 2
| align=center| 3:43
| Melbourne, Australia
| 
|-
| Loss
| align=center| 1–1
| Paul Loga
| Decision (unanimous)
| Eternal MMA 38
| 
| align=center| 3
| align=center| 5:00
| Findon, Australia
| 
|-
| Win
| align=center| 1–0
| Mark Familari 
| TKO (punches)
| Eternal MMA 37
| 
| align=center| 3
| align=center| 1:21
| Perth, Australia
| 
|-

Muay Thai and Kickboxing record

|- style="background:#fbb;"
|  2021-04-07 || Loss || align="left" | Rodtang Jitmuangnon || ONE on TNT 1 || Kallang, Singapore || Decision (unanimous) || 3 || 3:00
|- style="background:#cfc;"
|  2016-05-13 || Win || align="left" | Super Nong || Road to Rebellion 6 || Melbourne, Australia || Decision (unanimous) || 5 || 3:00
|- style="background:#fbb;"
|  2015-09-22 || Loss || align="left" | Charles Bongiovanni || K-1 World GP 2015 Survival Wars || Tokyo, Japan || KO (Punches) || 1 || 2:20

|- style="background:#cfc;"
|  2015-06-06 || Win || align="left" | Saksit Tor.Piamsabpetriew || Domination 15 || Perth, Australia || Decision || 5 || 3:00 
|-
! style=background:white colspan=9 |

|- style="background:#fbb;"
|  2015-04-19 || Loss || align="left" | Shota Takiya || K-1 World GP 2015 -55kg Championship Tournament || Tokyo, Japan || Decision (majority) || 3 || 3:00
|-
! style=background:white colspan=9 |
|- style="background:#cfc;"
|  2014-12-06 || Win || align="left" | Andy Howson || Caged Muay Thai 5 || Brisbane, Australia || Decision (split) || 5 || 3:00
|-
! style=background:white colspan=9 |

|- style="background:#cfc;"
|  2014-09-20 || Win || align="left" | Karl Hodgers || Origins 6 || Perth, Australia || KO || 3 || 1:48

|- style="background:#cfc;"
|  2013-12- || Win || align="left" | ||  ||  Australia || KO ||  ||  
|-
! style=background:white colspan=9 |

|- style="background:#fbb;"
|  2013-07-20 || Loss || align="left" | Dyki || RISE 94 || Tokyo, Japan || Decision (Unanimous) || 3 || 3:00

|- style="background:#cfc;"
|  2013-07-06 || Win || align="left" | Aaron Leigh || Caged Muay Thai 3 || Brisbane, Australia || KO || 4 || 2:47 
|-
! style=background:white colspan=9 |

|- style="background:#cfc;"
|  2013-05-03 || Win || align="left" | Liam Mcneill || Road to Rebellion 2 || Melbourne, Australia || Decision (Split)|| 5 || 3:00 

|- style="background:#cfc;"
|  2012-04-14 || Win || align="left" | Zac Einersen || Epic 5 || Perth, Australia || KO || 2 || 1:58

|- style="background:#cfc;"
|  2012-03-03 || Win || align="left" | Ben Brown || Domination 8 ||  Australia || Decision || 5 || 3:00

|- style="background:#cfc;"
|  2011-04-16 || Win || align="left" | Jesse Caruna || Domination 6 ||  Australia || KO || 4 ||  
|-
| colspan=9 | Legend:    

|- style="background:#cfc;"
|  2015-03-23 || Win|| align="left" | Ilkomjon Rustamov || 2015 IFMA-FISU Muaythai University World Cup, Final || Bangkok, Thailand || Decision || 3 || 3:00
|-
! style=background:white colspan=9 |
|- style="background:#cfc;"
|  2015-03- || Win|| align="left" |  ||  2015 IFMA-FISU Muaythai University World Cup, Semi Finals || Bangkok, Thailand || Decision || 3 || 3:00

|- style="background:#cfc;"
|  2015-03- || Win|| align="left" |  ||  2015 IFMA-FISU Muaythai University World Cup, Quarter Finals || Bangkok, Thailand || Decision || 3 || 3:00

|- style="background:#fbb;"
|  2014-05- || Loss || align="left" | Aleksandr Abramov || 2014 IFMA World Championship, Quarter Finals || Langkawi, Malaysia || Decision || 3 || 3:00

|-
| colspan=9 | Legend:

See also
List of current ONE fighters

References

External links
 Danial Williams at ONE Championship

1993 births
Living people
Australian Muay Thai practitioners
Australian male kickboxers
Australian male mixed martial artists
Flyweight mixed martial artists
Mixed martial artists utilizing Muay Thai
Australian people of Thai descent 
Danial Williams
ONE Championship kickboxers